Carme Nonell i Masjuan (born in Barcelona in 1920) was a Catalan novelist who wrote in Spanish. She was trained as an artist in Madrid.  She worked for ABC and served as a Berlin-based correspondent for Pueblo. Beyond novels, she also wrote about Spanish art and wrote tourist publications.

Novels 

 ¿Es usted mi marido?, (1942)
 Nocturno de amor, (1944)
 El Mayorazgo de Iziar, (1945)
 Caminos cruzados, (1946)
 El cauce perdido, (1946)
 Cumbres de amor (195?)
 Resurgir, (1953)
 Historia de "Farol", (1953)
 Zoco grande, (1956)
 Munich, Leopoldstrasse, 207, (1962)
 La vida empieza hoy, (1965)
 Los que se quedan, (1967)
 La "Perrona", (1967)

Art guides 

 Berlín, capital de dos mundos, (1963)
 Rutas de España: Valencia. Aragón, (1963)
 Rutas de España: La Rioja, Vascongadas (Guipozcoa, Vizcaya, Álava) y Navarra, (1967)
 Guías Everest: El Pirineo catalán, (1969), co-written with her sister Carolina Nonell.
 El arte asturianense, (1969)
 Teruel, ignorada maravilla, (1969)
 Guadalajara, nudo de la Alcarria, (1971).
 Cerámica y alfarería populares de España, (1973)

Children's literature 

 Los dos castillos, (1944)
 Gato y la estrella, (1966)

Guides 

 Los cinco (Balakiref, César, Cui, Barodin, Mussorgsky i Rimsky-Korsakof), (1948)

References 

Women writers from Catalonia
Novelists from Catalonia
Spanish women children's writers
Spanish women novelists
Spanish children's writers
20th-century Spanish novelists
20th-century Spanish women writers
Possibly living people
1920 births